Tiye (c. 1398 BC – 1338 BC, also spelled Tye, Taia, Tiy and Tiyi) was the Great Royal Wife of the Egyptian pharaoh Amenhotep III, mother of pharaoh Akhenaten and grandmother of pharaoh Tutankhamun; her parents were Yuya and Thuya. In 2010, DNA analysis confirmed her as the mummy known as "The Elder Lady" found in the tomb of Amenhotep II (KV35) in 1898.

Family and early life
Tiye's father, Yuya, was a non-royal, wealthy landowner from the Upper Egyptian town of Akhmim, where he served as a priest and superintendent of oxen or commander of the chariotry. Tiye's mother, Thuya, was involved in many religious cults, as her different titles attested (Singer of Hathor, Chief of the Entertainers of both Amun and Min...), which suggests that she was a member of the royal family.

Egyptologists have suggested that Tiye's father, Yuya, was of foreign origin due to the features of his mummy and the many different spellings of his name, which might imply it was a non-Egyptian name in origin. Some suggest that the queen's strong political and unconventional religious views might have been due not just to a strong character, but to foreign descent.

Tiye also had a brother, Anen, who was Second Prophet of Amun. Ay, a successor of Tutankhamun as pharaoh after the latter's death, is believed to be yet another brother of Tiye, despite no clear date or monument confirming a link between the two. Egyptologists presume this connection from Ay's origins (also from Akhmin), because he is known to have built a chapel dedicated to the local god Min there, and because he inherited most of the titles that Tiye's father, Yuya, held at the court of Amenhotep III during his lifetime.

Tiye was married to Amenhotep III by the second year of his reign. He had been born of a secondary wife of his father and needed a stronger tie to the royal lineage. Their marriage was celebrated by the issue of commemorative scarabs, announcing Tiye as Great Royal Wife and giving the names of her parents. He appears to have been crowned while still a child, perhaps between the ages of six and twelve. The couple had at least seven, and possibly more, children.

Issue
 Sitamun – The eldest daughter, who was elevated to the position of Great Royal Wife around year 30 of her father's reign.
 Isis – Also elevated to the position of Great Royal Wife.
 Henuttaneb – Not known to have been elevated to queenship, though her name does appear in a cartouche at least once.
 Nebetah – Sometimes thought to have been renamed Baketaten during her brother's reign.
 Crown Prince Thutmose – Crown Prince and High Priest of Ptah, pre-deceasing his father.
 Amenhotep IV/Akhenaten – Succeeded his father as pharaoh, husband of Queen Nefertiti, father of Ankhesenamun, who married Tutankhamun.
 Smenkhkare – traditionally seen as one of Akhenaten's immediate successors, today some Egyptologists such as Aidan Dodson believe he was the immediate predecessor of Neferneferuaten and a junior co-regent of Akhenaten who did not have an independent reign. Sometimes identified with the mummy from KV55, and therefore Tutankhamun's father.
 The Younger Lady from KV35 – A daughter of Amenhotep III and Tiye, mother of Tutankhamun and sister-wife of KV55. Presumably one of the already-known daughters of Amenhotep III and Tiye.
 Beketaten – Sometimes thought to be Queen Tiye's daughter, usually based on reliefs of Baketaten seated next to Tiye at dinner with Akhenaten and Nefertiti.

Monuments

Her husband devoted a number of shrines to her and constructed a temple dedicated to her in Sedeinga in Nubia where she was worshipped as a form of the goddess Hathor-Tefnut.  He also had an artificial lake built for her in his Year 12. On the colossal statue now in the Egyptian Museum she is of equal height with her husband. As the American Egyptologists David O'Connor and Eric Cline note:

Influence at court

Tiye wielded a great deal of power during both her husband's and son's reigns. Amenhotep III became a fine sportsman, a lover of outdoor life, and a great statesman. He often had to consider claims for Egypt's gold and requests for his royal daughters in marriage from foreign kings such as Tushratta of Mitanni and Kadashman-Enlil I of Babylon. The royal lineage was carried by the women of Ancient Egypt and marriage to one would have been a path to the throne for their progeny. Tiye became her husband's trusted adviser and confidant. Being wise, intelligent, strong, and fierce, she was able to gain the respect of foreign dignitaries. Foreign leaders were willing to deal directly with her. She continued to play an active role in foreign relations and was the first Egyptian queen to have her name recorded on official acts.

Tiye may have continued to advise her son, Akhenaten, when he took the throne. Her son’s correspondence with Tushratta, the king of Mitanni, speaks highly of the political influence she wielded at court. In Amarna letter EA 26, Tushratta, corresponded directly with Tiye to reminisce about the good relations he enjoyed with her then deceased husband and extended his wish to continue on friendly terms with her son, Akhenaten.

Amenhotep III died in Year 38 or Year 39 of his reign (1353 BC/1350 BC) and was buried in the Valley of the Kings in WV22; however, Tiye is known to have outlived him by as many as twelve years. Tiye continued to be mentioned in the Amarna letters and in inscriptions as queen and beloved of the king. Amarna letter EA 26, which is addressed to Tiye, dates to the reign of Akhenaten. She is known to have had a house at Akhetaten (Amarna), Akhenaten's new capital and is shown on the walls of the tomb of Huya – a "steward in the house of the king's mother, the great royal wife Tiyi" – depicted at a dinner table with Akhenaten, Nefertiti, and their family and then being escorted by the king to her sunshade. In an inscription approximately dated to November 21 of Year 12 of Akhenaten's reign (1338 BC), both she and her granddaughter Meketaten are mentioned for the last time. They are thought to have died shortly after that date. This information is corroborated by the fact that the shrine which Akhenaten created for her—which was later found transported from Amarna to tomb KV55 in Thebes—bore the later form of the Aten's name which was only used after Akhenaten's Year 9.

If Tiye died soon after Year 12 of Akhenaten's reign (1338 BC), this would place her birth around 1398 BC, her marriage to Amenhotep III at the age of eleven or twelve, and her becoming a widow at the age of forty-eight to forty-nine. Suggestions of a co-regency between Amenhotep III and his son Akhenaten lasting for up to twelve years continue, but most scholars today either accept a brief co-regency lasting no more than one year  or no co-regency at all.

Burial and mummy 

Tiye is believed to have been originally buried in the Royal Tomb at Amarna alongside her son Akhenaten and granddaughter, Meketaten. Evidence shows the two northern pillars of the incomplete pillared hall were removed to accommodate a sarcophagus plinth and  pieces of her smashed sarcophagus were found in and around the burial chamber. Analysis of the badly damaged decoration on the left wall beyond the plinth also indicates that Tiye was buried there. In a depiction that closely resembles the mourning of Meketaten in chamber γ, a figure stands beneath a floral canopy while the royal family grieves. The figure wears a queenly sash but cannot be Nefertiti as Nefertiti is shown with the mourners. Tiye's sarcophagus was likely contained within multiple nested shrines, like those of her grandson Tutankhamun. The inscription on a portion of such a shrine found in KV55 indicates that Akhenaten had the shrines made for his mother.

Following the move of the capital back to Thebes, Tiye, along with others buried in the royal tomb, were transferred to the Valley of the Kings. The presence of pieces of one of her gilded burial shrines in KV55 indicate she was likely interred there for a time. Provisions had been made during the reign of her husband Amenhotep III for her burial within his tomb, WV22. Shabti figures belonging to her were found in this tomb.

In 1898, three sets of mummified remains were found in a side chamber of the tomb of Amenhotep II in KV35 by Victor Loret. One was an older woman and the other two were a young boy who died at around the age of ten, thought to be Webensenu or Prince Thutmose, and a younger, unknown woman. The three were found lying naked side-by-side and unidentified. The mummy of the older woman, who would later be identified as Tiye, was referred to by Egyptologists as the 'Elder Lady' while the other woman was 'The Younger Lady'. Several researchers argued that the Elder Lady was Queen Tiye. There were other scholars who were skeptical of this theory, such as British scholars Aidan Dodson and Dyan Hilton, who once stated that "it seems very unlikely that her mummy could be the so-called 'Elder Lady' in the tomb of Amenhotep II." 

A nest of four miniature coffins inscribed with her name and containing a lock of hair was found in the tomb of her grandson Tutankhamun – perhaps a memento from a beloved grandmother. In 1976, microprobe analysis conducted on hair samples from the Elder Lady and the lock from the inscribed coffins found the two were a near perfect match, thereby identifying the Elder Lady as Tiye.

In 1980, James Harris and Edward F. Wente conducted X-ray examinations of New Kingdom Pharaoh's crania and skeletal remains. They examined the mummified remains of Queen Tiye and noted she possessed a craniofacial profile which was most similar to Mesolithic Nubians.

By 2010, DNA analysis, sponsored by the Secretary General of the Egyptian Supreme Council of Antiquities Zahi Hawass, was able to formally identify the Elder Lady as Queen Tiye. DNA results published in 2020 revealed that Tiye had the mtDNA haplogroup K (as did her mother, Thuya). Tiye's father Yuya was found to have the Y-DNA haplogroup G2a and mtDNA haplogroup K.

In 2022, S.O.Y. Keita analysed 8 Short Tandem loci (STR) published data from studies by Hawass et al. 2010;2012 which sought to determine familial relations and research pathological features such as potential, infectious diseases among the New Kingdom royal mummies which included her grandson Tutankhamun, husband Amenhotep III and Rameses III. Keita, using an algorithm that only has three choices: Eurasians, Sub-Saharan Africans, and East Asians concluded that the studies showed “a majority to have an affinity with “Sub-Saharan” Africans in one affinity analysis”. However, Keita cautioned that this does not mean that the royal mummies “lacked other affiliations” which he argued had been obscured in typological thinking. Keita further added that different “data and algorithms might give different results” which reflected the complexity of biological heritage and the associated interpretation.

Her mummy has the inventory number CG 61070. In April 2021 her mummy was moved from the Museum of Egyptian Antiquities to National Museum of Egyptian Civilization along with those of 3 other queens and 18 kings in an event termed the Pharaohs' Golden Parade.

References

Books

External links 
 Podcast on Queen Tiye,  "History of Egypt Podcast" series by Eyptologist Dominic Perry, 2020

 Podcast on the death of queen Tiye,  "History of Egypt Podcast" series by Eyptologist Dominic Perry, 2020

1390s BC births
1338 BC deaths
14th-century BC Egyptian women
Queens consort of the Eighteenth Dynasty of Egypt
Queen mothers
Ancient Egyptian mummies
Egyptian Museum
Wives of Amenhotep III